Catch-As-Catch-Can is a 1927 American silent sports crime film directed by Charles Hutchison and starring William Fairbanks, Rose Blossom and Walter Shumway

Cast
 William Fairbanks as Reed Powers
 Jack Blossom as George Bascom
 Rose Blossom as Lucille Bascom
 Larry Shannon as Phil Bascom
 Walter Shumway as Ward Hastings
 George Kotsonaros as Butch
 Georgie Chapman as Slippery Schnitzel

References

Bibliography
 Hal Erickson. Baseball in the Movies: A Comprehensive Reference, 1915-1991. McFarland, 1992.

External links
 

1927 films
1927 crime films
1920s sports films
American baseball films
American silent feature films
American crime films
American black-and-white films
Films directed by Charles Hutchison
Gotham Pictures films
1920s English-language films
1920s American films
Silent sports films